Thermogutta terrifontis is a thermophilic bacterium from the genus of Thermogutta which has been isolated from a hot spring from Kurils in Russia.

References

Bacteria described in 2015
Planctomycetota